Narrow gauge railways in the United Kingdom could refer to:
 British narrow gauge railways
 Narrow gauge railways in England
 Narrow gauge railways in Scotland
 Narrow gauge railways in Wales
 Narrow gauge railways in Northern Ireland

Also see:
 Narrow gauge railways in the Isle of Man